Taupō Central  is the central suburb and business district of Taupō in the Waikato region of New Zealand's North Island.

An eight-storey hotel was proposed in the CBD in 2018. It would have been Taupō's tallest building. As the Council had a three-storey limit at that time, consent required a decision by the Environment Court, which allowed a six-storey building in June 2020. The hotel was still unbuilt as of May 2022.

Taupō Museum is located in Taupō Central. It opened in the 1970s.

Demographics

Taupō Central had a population of 7,680 at the 2018 New Zealand census, an increase of 450 people (6.2%) since the 2013 census, and an increase of 198 people (2.6%) since the 2006 census. There were 2,856 households, comprising 3,684 males and 3,990 females, giving a sex ratio of 0.92 males per female, with 1,581 people (20.6%) aged under 15 years, 1,500 (19.5%) aged 15 to 29, 3,294 (42.9%) aged 30 to 64, and 1,311 (17.1%) aged 65 or older.

Ethnicities were 72.6% European/Pākehā, 29.6% Māori, 4.5% Pacific peoples, 8.3% Asian, and 2.0% other ethnicities. People may identify with more than one ethnicity.

The percentage of people born overseas was 20.5, compared with 27.1% nationally.

Although some people chose not to answer the census's question about religious affiliation, 51.8% had no religion, 32.3% were Christian, 3.9% had Māori religious beliefs, 1.8% were Hindu, 0.2% were Muslim, 0.7% were Buddhist and 2.7% had other religions.

Of those at least 15 years old, 897 (14.7%) people had a bachelor's or higher degree, and 1,143 (18.7%) people had no formal qualifications. 714 people (11.7%) earned over $70,000 compared to 17.2% nationally. The employment status of those at least 15 was that 3,144 (51.5%) people were employed full-time, 966 (15.8%) were part-time, and 198 (3.2%) were unemployed.

Education

The school opened in 1894.

The school opened in 1970. A planned 50th jubilee in 2020 was postponed due to the COVID-19 pandemic.

The college opened in 1960, replacing the Taupo District High School which operated from 1951 to 1959.

All these schools are co-educational. Rolls are as of

References

Suburbs of Taupō
Populated places in Waikato
Central business districts in New Zealand
Populated places on Lake Taupō